Heritage Great Britain PLC is an attractions company that operates numerous sites in the UK. The company used to own and operate Lightwater Valley.

Founded in 1999, Heritage Great Britain operates landmark destinations and visitor attractions in the UK. The company is headquartered in Liverpool.

The company is an unlisted public company owned by Jersey based Cherberry ltd.

List of attractions

Current 
John O'Groats
Land's End
The Needles Landmark Attraction
Snowdon Mountain Railway

Former 

 Lightwater Valley (Managed by Heritage Great Britain, owned by Ball Investments. Sold to Livingstone Leisure in 2017)

References

External links
Official website

Amusement park companies
Leisure companies of the United Kingdom